Donore (meaning "fort of pride"), historically Dunower, is a small village in County Meath, Ireland.
It lies near Drogheda on the border between County Meath and County Louth, in the Boyne Valley on the road between Drogheda and the Brú na Bóinne heritage site. During the late 17th century, the village was used as a defensive position by the Jacobite army of King James II against King William III during the Battle of the Boyne (1690). The Battle of the Boyne Visitor Centre is located in the restored 18th century Oldbridge House, which is on the battle site, approximately 3 km north of Donore.

The village more than doubled in population in the early 21st century, growing from 334 inhabitants as of the 2002 census to 760 as of the 2016 census. Donore now has a pub and restaurant, shops, a take-away and a hairdresser.

The local Gaelic football team is called St Mary's.

St. Mary's Roman Catholic Church, which is in the center of Donore village, was built between c.1840.

Public transport
Donore is served by Bus Éireann route 163 operating between Drogheda and the Brú na Bóinne Visitor Centre. The nearest railway station is Drogheda railway station approximately 6 kilometres distant.

References

Towns and villages in County Meath